Matthieu Patrick François Péché (born 7 October 1987, in Épinal) is former French slalom canoeist who has competed at the international level since 2003.His career ended in 2018 after C2 category was removed from the World cup and World championship.

He won a bronze medal in the C2 event at the 2016 Summer Olympics in Rio de Janeiro. He also competed at the 2012 Summer Olympics in London where he finished in 4th place in the C2 event.

He won six medals at the ICF Canoe Slalom World Championships with five golds (C2: 2017, C2 team: 2010, 2011, 2014, 2015) and a bronze (C2: 2015). He also won two golds, a silver and a bronze in the C2 team event at the European Championships.

Péché won the overall world cup title in the C2 category in 2013 and 2015.

His partner in the C2 boat is Gauthier Klauss.

World Cup individual podiums

References

External links
 

French male canoeists
Living people
1987 births
Canoeists at the 2012 Summer Olympics
Canoeists at the 2016 Summer Olympics
Olympic canoeists of France
Sportspeople from Épinal
Olympic bronze medalists for France
Olympic medalists in canoeing
Medalists at the 2016 Summer Olympics
Medalists at the ICF Canoe Slalom World Championships
20th-century French people
21st-century French people